Justice Collins may refer to:

Gilbert Collins (1846–1920), associate justice of the New Jersey Supreme Court
Jon R. Collins (1923–1987), associate justice of the Supreme Court of Nevada
Loren W. Collins (1838–1912), associate justice of the Minnesota Supreme Court
Lorin C. Collins Jr. (1848–1940), associate justice of the Supreme Court of the Panama Canal Zone
Samuel Collins (politician) (1923–2012), associate justice of the Maine Supreme Judicial Court
Stephen R. Collins (1896–1985), associate justice of the Maryland Court of Appeals

See also
Lord Justice Collins (disambiguation)